The Folsom South Canal is an aqueduct in Northern California in the United States. The canal is operated by the U.S. Bureau of Reclamation, as part of the Auburn-Folsom South Unit of the Central Valley Project. It is contracted for irrigation, industrial and municipal water supply; formerly it provided cooling water for the Rancho Seco Nuclear Generating Station. It is also connected to the Mokelumne Aqueduct, which provides a large portion of the San Francisco Bay Area's water supply.

Construction of the canal began on July 28, 1952, with the excavation of the diversion inlet channel at Nimbus Dam, then also under construction. However, work on the main section of the canal was not begun for almost 20 years. In 1970 and 1971 the Bureau of Reclamation awarded three contracts for Folsom South Canal construction to Syblon-Reid Company, Gordon H. Ball Inc., and Western Contracting Company for a total of $25,556,469. The first water delivery was on June 27, 1973, and the canal was completed by the end of 1973.

The Folsom South Canal Trail, a paved hiking/biking path, runs along the canal from the northern end of the canal near the Nimbus Dam (0.3mi) to Sloughhouse Rd (13.9mi).

See also
Water in California

References

Aqueducts in California
American River (California)
Transportation buildings and structures in Sacramento County, California
Central Valley Project
Folsom, California
1973 establishments in California
Infrastructure completed in 1973